Guardiola diehlii is a very rare (quite possibly extinct) North American species of plants in the family Asteraceae, found only in the state of New Mexico in the southwestern United States.

One plant will produce several flower heads in a flat-topped array. Each head contains only one white ray flower and 4 disc flowers.

References

diehlii
Flora of New Mexico
Plants described in 1908